Iliarde Santos (born September 25, 1980) is a Brazilian mixed martial artist currently competing in the Flyweight division. A professional competitor since 2006, he has competed for the UFC, Titan FC, and Jungle Fight.

Mixed martial arts career

Early career
Santos started his professional career in 2006. Until 2011, he fought mainly for local promotions in Northern Brazil.

Jungle Fight
Santos obtained two victories and one loss in the organization before a bantamweight title eliminator match against Luciano Aparecido on July 30, 2011 at Jungle Fight 30, in which he won via TKO in the very first round.

Santos next faced John Lineker on October 22, 2011 at Jungle Fight 32 for the Jungle Fight bantamweight title. He lost via split decision.

Iron Fight Combat title and UFC contract
Santos faced Alan Barros on September 1, 2012 at Iron Fight Combat 1 for the Iron Fight Combat bantamweight title. He won via TKO in round one.

In 2012, Santos has amassed a total of six victories, including a victory over Leandro Higo, and in 2013 he signed with the UFC.

Ultimate Fighting Championship
Santos made his promotional debut replacing an injured Marcos Vinicius against Iuri Alcântara on May 18, 2013 at UFC on FX: Belfort vs. Rockhold. He lost via TKO in the first round.

Santos next moved down to flyweight and faced Ian McCall on August 3, 2013 at UFC 163. He lost via unanimous decision (30-27, 30-27, 29-28), and the performance earned both participants Fight of the Night honors.

Santos next faced Chris Cariaso on October 9, 2013 at UFC Fight Night: Maia vs. Shields. He lost the fight via TKO in the second round and was subsequently released from the promotion following the loss.

Titan Fighting Championship
In January 2014, Santos signed with Titan Fighting Championship. Santos is expected to take on fellow UFC veteran Jeff Curran in April.

Championships and accomplishments

Mixed martial arts
Ultimate Fighting Championship
Fight of the Night (one time) vs. Ian McCall
Iron Fight Combat
Iron Fight Combat bantamweight title (one time)

Mixed martial arts record

|-
| Win
| align=center| 32–14–1 (1)
| Eder Sampaio Meneses
| TKO (punches)
| Arena Fight 8 - In Memory of Meire Cabral
| 
| align=center| 2
| align=center| 3:50
| Redenção, Pará, Brazil
|

|-
| Loss
| align=center| 31–14–1 (1)
| Raulian Paiva Frazao
| KO (punches)
| SMF - Salvaterra Marajo Fight 7
| 
| align=center| 1
| align=center| 0:58
| Salvaterra, Pará, Brazil
|
|-
| Loss
| align=center| 31–13–1 (1)
| Pedro Falcao
| Decision (unanimous)
| Shooto Brazil - Shooto Brazil 74
| 
| align=center| 3
| align=center| 5:00
| Rio de Janeiro, Brazil
|
|-
| Win
| align=center| 31–12–1 (1)
| Rafael de Abreu
| TKO (punches)
| Aspera FC 55 - Aspera Fighting Championship 55
| 
| align=center| 1
| align=center| 4:14
| Maringá, Brazil
|
|-
| Loss
| align=center| 30–12–1 (1)
| Cleverson Silva
| Decision (unanimous)
| Mr. Cage Championship - Mr. Cage 27
| 
| align=center| 5
| align=center| 5:00
| Coari, Brazil
|
|-
| Loss
| align=center| 30–12–1 (1)
| Johnatha Guido dos Santos Silveira
| Decision (unanimous)
| Thunder Fight 10 - Guido vs. Iliarde
| 
| align=center| 3
| align=center| 5:00
| São_Paulo, Brazil
|
|-
| Win
| align=center| 30–11–1 (1)
| Bruno Viana
| Decision (split)
| AFC - Aspera Fighting Championship 35
| 
| align=center| 3
| align=center| 5:00
| Ji-Paraná, Brazil
|
|-
| Loss
| align=center| 29–11–1 (1)
| Rafael Dias
| Decision (split)
| MC - Mr. Cage 21
| 
| align=center| 3
| align=center| 5:00
| Manaus, Brazil
|
|-
| Win
| align=center| 29–10–1 (1)
| Giliarde Silva
| Submission (arm-triangle choke)
| MC - Mr. Cage 20
| 
| align=center| 3
| align=center| 4:30
| Manaus, Brazil
|

|-
| Loss
| align=center| 28–10–1 (1)
| Tim Elliott
| Decision (unanimous)
| Titan FC 34
| 
| align=center| 5
| align=center| 5:00
| Kansas City, Missouri, United States
| 
|-
| Win
| align=center| 28–9–1 (1)
| Nick Honstein
| Decision (unanimous)
| Titan FC 32
| 
| align=center| 3
| align=center| 5:00
| Lowell, Massachusetts, United States
| 
|-
| Loss
| align=center| 27–9–1 (1)
| Chris Cariaso
| TKO (punches)
| UFC Fight Night: Maia vs. Shields
| 
| align=center| 2
| align=center| 4:31
| Barueri, São Paulo, Brazil
| 
|-
| Loss
| align=center| 27–8–1 (1)
| Ian McCall
| Decision (unanimous)
| UFC 163
| 
| align=center| 3
| align=center| 5:00
| Rio de Janeiro, Brazil
| 
|-
| Loss
| align=center| 27–7–1 (1)
| Iuri Alcântara
| KO (punches)
| UFC on FX: Belfort vs. Rockhold
| 
| align=center| 1
| align=center| 2:31
| Jaraguá do Sul, Santa Catarina, Brazil
| 
|-
| Win
| align=center| 27–6–1 (1)
| Maycon Silvan
| Decision (unanimous)
| Best of the Best: Pará vs. Brazil
| 
| align=center| 3
| align=center| 5:00
| Belém, Pará, Brazil
| 
|-
| Win
| align=center| 26–6–1 (1)
| Alan Barros
| TKO (punches)
| Iron Fight Combat 1
| 
| align=center| 1
| align=center| 1:04
| Feira de Santana, Bahia, Brazil
| 
|-
| Win
| align=center| 25–6–1 (1)
| Leandro Higo
| Decision (unanimous)
| Jungle Fight 38
| 
| align=center| 3
| align=center| 5:00
| Belém, Pará, Brazil
| 
|-
| Win
| align=center| 24–6–1 (1)
| Emiliano Vatti
| Submission (kimura)
| Iron Man Championship 14
| 
| align=center| 1
| align=center| N/A
| Belém, Pará, Brazil
| 
|-
| Win
| align=center| 23–6–1 (1)
| Jose Delgadillo
| TKO (punches)
| Amazon Fight 15
| 
| align=center| 1
| align=center| 1:57
| Belém, Pará, Brazil
| 
|-
| Win
| align=center| 22–6–1 (1)
| Daniel Lima de Carvalho
| TKO (punches)
| Iron Man Championship 13
| 
| align=center| 1
| align=center| 1:57
| Belém, Pará, Brazil
| 
|-
| NC
| align=center| 21–6–1 (1)
| Eduardo Felipe
| NC (accidental knee to downed Felipe)
| Jungle Fight 33
| 
| align=center| 2
| align=center| N/A
| Rio de Janeiro, Brazil
| 
|-
| Loss
| align=center| 21–6–1
| John Lineker
| Decision (split)
| Jungle Fight 32
| 
| align=center| 3
| align=center| 5:00
| São Paulo, Brazil
| 
|-
| Win
| align=center| 21–5–1
| Luciano Aparecido
| TKO (punches)
| Jungle Fight 30
| 
| align=center| 1
| align=center| 2:03
| Belém, Pará, Brazil
| 
|-
| Loss
| align=center| 20–5–1
| Renato Moicano
| Decision (unanimous)
| Jungle Fight 29
| 
| align=center| 3
| align=center| 5:00
| Serra, Espírito Santo, Brazil
| 
|-
| Win
| align=center| 20–4–1
| Armando Gomes
| TKO (doctor stoppage)
| Jungle Fight 28
| 
| align=center| 2
| align=center| 2:30
| Rio de Janeiro, Brazil
| 
|-
| Win
| align=center| 19–4–1
| Antenor Pereira
| Submission (heel hook)
| Jungle Fight 26
| 
| align=center| 1
| align=center| 1:10
| São Paulo, Brazil
| 
|-
| Win
| align=center| 18–4–1
| Eder da Silva
| TKO (punches)
| Colisão Fighting Championship 2
| 
| align=center| 1
| align=center| N/A
| Marituba, Pará, Brazil
| 
|-
| Win
| align=center| 17–4–1
| Renato Gomes
| TKO (punches)
| Iron Man Championship 8
| 
| align=center| 2
| align=center| N/A
| Belém, Pará, Brazil
| 
|-
| Win
| align=center| 16–4–1
| Paulo Dinis
| Submission (armbar)
| Gladiators Fighting Championship 2
| 
| align=center| 2
| align=center| 4:35
| Curitiba, Paraná, Brazil
| 
|-
| Win
| align=center| 15–4–1
| Guilherme Matos
| Decision (unanimous)
| Iron Man Championship 7
| 
| align=center| 3
| align=center| 5:00
| Belém, Pará, Brazil
| 
|-
| Win
| align=center| 14–4–1
| Fabio da Rocha
| Decision (unanimous)
| Iron Man Championship: Extreme
| 
| align=center| 3
| align=center| 5:00
| Belém, Pará, Brazil
| 
|-
| Loss
| align=center| 13–4–1
| Guilherme Matos
| KO (punch)
| Iron Man Championship 6
| 
| align=center| 2
| align=center| 3:22
| Belém, Pará, Brazil
| 
|-
| Win
| align=center| 13–3–1
| Nelson Velasques
| Submission (rear-naked choke)
| GFSP: Gladiador Fight
| 
| align=center| 1
| align=center| N/A
| Araçatuba, São Paulo, Brazil
| 
|-
| Win
| align=center| 12–3–1
| Marcio Cesar
| TKO (punches)
| Power Fight Extreme 2
| 
| align=center| 2
| align=center| 1:20
| Curitiba, Paraná, Brazil
| 
|-
| Loss
| align=center| 11–3–1
| Genair da Silva
| TKO (punches)
| Nitrix: Show Fight 4
| 
| align=center| 1
| align=center| 2:32
| Balneário Camboriú, Santa Catarina, Brazil
| 
|-
| Win
| align=center| 11–2–1
| Gilmar Dutra
| TKO (punches)
| Samurai FC 2: Warrior's Return
| 
| align=center| 1
| align=center| 0:23
| Curitiba, Paraná, Brazil
| 
|-
| Win
| align=center| 10–2–1
| Adriano Silva
| TKO (punches)
| Iron Man Championship 4
| 
| align=center| 1
| align=center| 4:00
| Belém, Pará, Brazil
| 
|-
| Win
| align=center| 9–2–1
| Diego Battaglia
| TKO (punches)
| Full Heroes Battle 1
| 
| align=center| 3
| align=center| 2:44
| Paranaguá, Paraná, Brazil
| 
|-
| Win
| align=center| 8–2–1
| Geovani de Lima
| Submission (heel hook)
| Full Heroes Battle 1
| 
| align=center| 1
| align=center| 2:04
| Paranaguá, Paraná, Brazil
| 
|-
| Loss
| align=center| 7–2–1
| Marcos Rodrigues
| Decision (split)
| Real Fight 7
| 
| align=center| 3
| align=center| 5:00
| São José dos Campos, São Paulo, Brazil
| 
|-
| Win
| align=center| 7–1–1
| Rogerio de Souza
| Decision (split)
| Iron Man Vale Tudo 16
| 
| align=center| 3
| align=center| 5:00
| Macapá, Amapá, Brazil
| 
|-
| Loss
| align=center| 6–1–1
| Diego Braga
| Decision (split)
| Imperio Fight
| 
| align=center| 3
| align=center| 5:00
| Belém, Pará, Brazil
| 
|-
| Win
| align=center| 6–0–1
| Rivanio Regiz
| Decision (unanimous)
| Iron Man Championship: Champions
| 
| align=center| 3
| align=center| 5:00
| Belém, Pará, Brazil
| 
|-
| Win
| align=center| 5–0–1
| Rafael Addario
| Decision (unanimous)
| Iron Man Championship 1
| 
| align=center| 3
| align=center| 5:00
| Belém, Pará, Brazil
| 
|-
| Win
| align=center| 4–0–1
| Michel Addario
| Submission (kneebar)
| Midway Fight
| 
| align=center| 1
| align=center| N/A
| Belém, Pará, Brazil
| 
|-
| Draw
| align=center| 3–0–1
| Adson Lira
| Draw
| Desafio de Gigantes 9
| 
| align=center| 3
| align=center| 5:00
| Macapá, Amapá, Brazil
| 
|-
| Win
| align=center| 3–0
| Bruno Dantas
| TKO (punches)
| Mega Champion Fight 2
| 
| align=center| 3
| align=center| 1:46
| Manaus, Amazonas, Brazil
| 
|-
| Win
| align=center| 2–0
| Alexandre Alcântara
| Decision (unanimous)
| Nutripower Fighting Championship
| 
| align=center| 3
| align=center| 5:00
| Belém, Pará, Brazil
| 
|-
| Win
| align=center| 1–0
| Glauco Correa
| Decision (unanimous)
| Midway Fight
| 
| align=center| 3
| align=center| 5:00
| Belém, Pará, Brazil
|

References

External links
 
 

1980 births
Living people
Sportspeople from Belém
Brazilian male mixed martial artists
Flyweight mixed martial artists
Mixed martial artists utilizing Brazilian jiu-jitsu
Ultimate Fighting Championship male fighters
Brazilian practitioners of Brazilian jiu-jitsu
People awarded a black belt in Brazilian jiu-jitsu